XAG may refer to:

 XAG (company), Chinese manufacturer of agricultural drones
 the ISO 4217 currency code denoting one troy ounce of silver